Douglas Fitzell (born 1994) is an Irish hurler who plays as a left corner-back for the Kerry senior team.

Born in Kilmoyley, County Kerry, Fitzell first played competitive hurling during his schooling at Causeway Comprehensive School. He arrived on the inter-county scene at the age of seventeen when he first linked up with the Kerry minor team before later joining the under-21 side. He made his senior debut during the 2014 league. Fitzell quickly became a regular member of the starting fifteen and has won one Christy Ring Cup medal.

At club level Fitzell plays with Kilmoyley.

Honours

Team

Kilmoyley
Kerry Senior Hurling Championship (4): 2015, 2016, 2020, 2021
Munster Intermediate Club Hurling Championship (1): 2021

Kerry
Christy Ring Cup (1): 2015
National League (Division 2A) (1): 2015
All-Ireland Under 21 B Hurling Championship (1): 2013
All-Ireland Minor B Hurling Championship (1): 2012

References

1994 births
Living people
Kilmoyley hurlers
Kerry inter-county hurlers
Hurling backs